El Guettar may refer to:
El Guettar, Algeria, a town in Relizane Province, Algeria
El Guettar, Tunisia, a town in Gafsa Governorate, Tunisia
Battle of El Guettar, engagement in World War II fought near the Tunisian town